The 2nd Punjab Regiment was a British Indian Army regiment from 1922 to the partition of India in 1947.

The regiment was formed by the amalgamation of other regiments:
1st Battalion, from the 67th Punjabis, formerly the 7th Regiment of Madras Native Infantry
2nd Battalion, from the 69th Punjabis
3rd Battalion, from the 72nd Punjabis
4th Battalion, from the 74th Punjabis
5th Battalion, from the 87th Punjabis
10th (Training) Battalion, formed by redesignation of 2nd Bn, 67th Punjabis

History 
The first battalion was raised at Trichinopoly in 1761 as "Coast Sepoys". The first four battalions were raised during the hostilities in the Carnatic in south India between 1761 and 1776. The numbers and titles of the battalions changed during the successive reorganisations of the Madras Presidency Army and later of the Indian Army.

The regiment insignia is of a naval vessel, a galley. It was awarded to the 9th Madras Native Infantry in recognition of the readiness to serve overseas, after the battalion had fought in eight overseas campaigns by 1824.

Battle honours
The Great War:  Loos, France and Flanders 1915, Helles, Krithia, Gallipoli 1915, Suez Canal, Egypt 1915–17, Gaza, Megiddo, Sharon, Nablus, Palestine 1917–18, Defence of Kut al Amara, Kut al Amara 1917, Baghdad, Mesopotamia 1915–18, Aden, E Africa 1914–17, NW Frontier India 1915 '16–17
Afghanistan 1919
Second World War:  Keren, Ad Teclesan, Amba Alagi, Abyssinia 1940–41, Central Malaya, Ipoh, Singapore Island, Malaya 1941–42, North Africa 1940–43, Casa Bettini, Italy 1943–45, Buthidaung, Ngakedaung Pass, North Arakan, Imphal, Litan, Kanglatongbi, Tengnoupal, Tonzang, Kennedy Peak, Defence of Meiktila, Pyinmana, Burma 1942–45.

References 

Military units and formations established in 1761
P
British Indian Army infantry regiments
Honourable East India Company regiments
Indian World War II regiments
R
Military units and formations in British Somaliland in World War II
R